William John Youden (April 12, 1900 – March 31, 1971) was an Australian-born American statistician who formulated new statistical techniques in statistical analysis and in design of experiments. He developed the "Youden square", an incomplete block design developed from a 1937 paper, "Use of Incomplete Block Replications in Estimating Tobacco Mosaic Virus". He also helped to introduce the concept of restricted randomization, which he called constrained randomization. He devised Youden's J statistic as a simple measure summarising the performance of a binary diagnostic test.

In 1951 he was elected as a Fellow of the American Statistical Association.
The American Statistical Association bestows the W. J. Youden Award in Interlaboratory Testing to authors "of publications that make outstanding contributions to the design and/or analysis of interlaboratory tests or describe ingenious approaches to the planning and evaluation of data from such tests." The award is presented each year at the Joint Statistical Meetings.

In 1967, Youden served as president of the Philosophical Society of Washington, a science organization.

References

External links

1900 births
1971 deaths
University of Rochester alumni
American statisticians
20th-century American mathematicians
Fellows of the American Statistical Association